I'll Get You For This is a 1946  action thriller novel by British writer James Hadley Chase.

Synopsis
Chester Cain, a small-time ex hit man and ace gambler, tired of his old life, moves to Paradise Palms, "some seventy miles from Miami", to start a new life with his lifetime savings, only to come across a set of ruthless people who try to use him and implicate him in a crime which he has not committed. Soon the cops are after Cain, who goes on the run, along with newfound Ms.Wonderly, a homeless wayward girl, who has also been framed like him. Cain is left with no choice but to use his skills to prove his innocence and get to the bottom of his and Wonderly's false implication.

This book is incredibly action-packed, despite the fact that Chase novels are typically thrillers and not just action novels.

See also
I'll Get You for This, 1951 film of the book

References

External links
James Hadley Chase tribute website.

1946 British novels
Novels by James Hadley Chase
British thriller novels
Novels set in the Las Vegas Valley
British novels adapted into films
Jarrold Publishing books